The Bund III is a Hong Kong period drama television series broadcast on TVB in 1980. The series is a direct sequel to The Bund and The Bund II, which were both released earlier in the same year.

Plot
The story continues from the end of The Bund II and chronicles the final years of Ting Lik's long reign as master of the Shanghai underworld.

Cast

 Ray Lui as Ting Lik
 Susanna Au-yeung as Yip Chau-ying
 Wong Yuen-sun as Kei Sin-yung
 Felix Wong
 Chow Sau-lan

1980 Hong Kong television series debuts
1981 Hong Kong television series endings
TVB dramas
The Bund (TV series)
Sequel television series
Cantonese-language television shows
Television shows set in Shanghai
Triad (organized crime)